Weightlifting at the 2005 Islamic Solidarity Games was held at the Amanat Al-Madina Hall, Medina from April 13 to April 17, 2005.

Medalists

Total

Snatch

Clean & jerk

Medal table

References
  Medal table

2005 Islamic Solidarity Games
Islamic Solidarity Games
2005
Islamic Solidarity Games